Sinthusa nasaka, the narrow spark, is a small butterfly found in India that belongs to the lycaenids or blues family.

Range: India to Taiwan, including Sundaland, the Philippines and Sulawesi (Hong Kong, Fujian, Guangxi and Hainan), Sikkim to Burma, Thailand, Laos, India (Meghalaya, Alipurduar, Darjeeling, Jalpaiguri and Nagaland), Bangladesh
and Sunderland.

See also
List of butterflies of India
List of butterflies of India (Lycaenidae)

References
 
 
 Shihan, T.R. (2015). A New Record of Butterfly Sinthusa nasaka Horsfield, 1829 (Lepidoptera: Lycaenidae) for Bangladesh. Journal of Entomology and Zoology Studies 3(4): 120-123

Sinthusa
Butterflies of Asia
Butterflies of Singapore